General Sir William Henry Mackinnon,  (15 December 1852 – 17 March 1929) was a British Army General during World War I.

Military career
Educated at Rose Hill School and then Harrow School, Henry Mackinnon was commissioned into the Grenadier Guards in 1870. He was appointed Military Secretary to Governor of Malta in 1884 and then Private Secretary to the Governor of Madras in India in 1885–1887. He then became Assistant Adjutant General at Home District in 1893.

After the outbreak of the Second Boer War in October 1899, a corps of imperial volunteers from London was formed in late December 1899. The corps included infantry, mounted infantry and artillery (the latter including members of the Honourable Artillery Company and the City of London Artillery), and was authorized with the name City of London Imperial Volunteers. It proceeded to South Africa in January 1900, returned in October the same year, and was disbanded in December 1900. Colonel Mackinnon was appointed Colonel commandant of the corps 22 December 1899, and served as such until it was disbanded.

He was invested as a Commander of the Royal Victorian Order (CVO) on 11 August 1902.

He was later appointed Director of Auxiliary Forces in 1905 and Director General of the Territorial Force in 1908. He was appointed General Officer Commanding-in-Chief for Western Command in 1910; he retired in 1916.

He lived at Carlisle Place in London.

Family
In 1881 he married Madeleine Frances Hatton and they went on to have one daughter.

References

 

|-
 

1852 births
1929 deaths
British Army generals
People educated at Harrow School
British Army generals of World War I
Knights Grand Cross of the Order of the Bath
Knights Commander of the Royal Victorian Order
Grenadier Guards officers
British Army personnel of the Second Boer War